David Pearey (born 15 July 1948) was the Governor of the British Virgin Islands from 18 April 2006 to 5 August 2010. He was appointed by Queen Elizabeth II on the advice of the British government, to represent the Queen in the territory, and to act as the de facto head of state.

Prior to his appointment as governor, Pearey served as High Commissioner to Malawi from 2004 to 2005.

Education and personal life 
Pearey was educated at the University of Oxford, where he studied PPE (Philosophy, Politics and Economics) at Corpus Christi College.

He has a wife, Susan, and one daughter Poppy who studies Archaeology and Anthropology at Keble College, University of Oxford following in her father’s footsteps.

See also

 Governor of the British Virgin Islands

Sources
 Foreign & Commonwealth Office - David Pearey

1948 births
Governors of the British Virgin Islands
Living people
High Commissioners of the United Kingdom to Malawi